A Network Termination Device (NTD) is a customer-side network interface device used by the Australian National Broadband Network (NBN). Network termination devices provide multiple bridges for customers to access the NBN. There are different types of NTDs for the various connection technologies encompassed by NBN. All connection types except FTTN use NTDs on premises. Depending on the kind of link, NTDs typically provide two telephony and four data channels. An external power source is required, and an uninterruptible power supply (UPS) can be used to maintain connection in power outages (battery backups are available for the FTTP NTD). FTTC requires power to be provided from the premises to the kerb (distribution point).

NTDs provide user–network interface (UNI) connections for connection of in-premises devices. They typically have multiple RJ45 jacks for the UNI-D (data) connection, and some models have RJ11 jacks for the UNI-V (voice) connection. All NTDs are capable of passing VoIP traffic. FTTN requires premises to have a compatible VDSL2 modem. Each UNI-D port can be activated by retail service providers for different NBN services. The NTD cannot be used as a Layer 3 router for in-premises networking.

Most devices used in NBN are produced by Alcatel-Lucent, currently a division of Nokia Corporation. In FTTC networks, the hardware from domestic manufacturers CASA Systems (formerly NetComm) and Adtran are used (noting that the device is formally called an NCD), and in HFC networks from Arris, currently a division of CommScope. FTTN networks, based on VDSL2 technology, can be accessed with any compatible modem or router that supports VDSL2. NBN itself doesn't sell any VDSL2-compatible hardware and it must be supplied by end-user of the network.

Network technologies

Gallery

References

National Broadband Network
Networking hardware